Enantiophylla is a genus of flowering plants belonging to the family Apiaceae. It has one species, Enantiophylla heydeana, native to Mexico and Central America.

References

Apioideae
Monotypic Apioideae genera